Tommy Millar (3 December 1938 – 29 July 2001) was a Scottish professional footballer, who played as a right back.

Career
Millar signed professional forms with Colchester United in 1959 and went on to play nearly fifty league games before leaving in 1961 to join Dundee United. Millar spent eight years at Tannadice and was joined by his brother Jimmy for the final two years, the forward signing from Rangers. After over 200 league matches for The Terrors, Millar moved to Cowdenbeath, where his single season preceded similar spells at Berwick Rangers and finally Hamilton Academical. Upon retiring in 1971, Millar had played in just under 300 senior league matches, scoring twelve times.

Millar died in 2001.

Honours

Club
Colchester United
 Football League Fourth Division Runner-up (1): 1961–62

Cowdenbeath
 Scottish Second Division Runner-up (1): 1969–70

References

External links
 

1938 births
Footballers from Edinburgh
2001 deaths
Scottish footballers
Scottish expatriate footballers
Colchester United F.C. players
Dundee United F.C. players
Dallas Tornado players
Cowdenbeath F.C. players
Berwick Rangers F.C. players
Hamilton Academical F.C. players
Scottish Football League players
United Soccer Association players
Association football fullbacks
Expatriate soccer players in the United States
Scottish expatriate sportspeople in the United States